Kiwai is a union council of Mansehra District of Khyber Pakhtunkhwa province of Pakistan. It is located on the way to Kaghan Valley. Payee Lake is accessible via Kiwai passing through Shogran by a jeep track.

See also
 Kaghan Valley
 Lalazar
 Shogran

References

Union councils of Mansehra District